The Caledonia Glacigenic Group is a Quaternary lithostratigraphic group (a sequence of rock strata or other definable geological units) present across the whole of Great Britain to the north and west of the furthest limit of Devensian glaciation i.e. throughout Scotland, Wales and northern England. It consists of a wide range of deposits deriving from the Devensian glaciation of glacial, glaciofluvial, glaciolacustrine and glaciomarine origin. It was previously known as the South Britain Glacigenic Group. Its upper boundary is the present day ground surface or an unconformable contact with the Britannia Catchments Group or the British Coastal Deposits Group.

The following subgroups are defined:

 Shetland Glacigenic Subgroup
 Western Isles Glacigenic Subgroup
 Northwest Highlands Glacigenic Subgroup
 Banffshire Coast and Caithness Glacigenic Subgroup
 Inverness Glacigenic Subgroup
 East Grampian Glacigenic Subgroup
 Logie-Buchan Glacigenic Subgroup
 Central Grampian Glacigenic Subgroup
 Mearns Glacigenic Subgroup
 Midland Valley Glacigenic Subgroup
 Borders Glacigenic Subgroup
 Southern Uplands Glacigenic Subgroup
 Irish Sea Coast Glacigenic Subgroup
 Manx Glacigenic Subgroup
 Central Cumbria Glacigenic Subgroup
 North Pennine Glacigenic Subgroup
 North Sea Coast Glacigenic Subgroup
 Wales Glacigenic Subgroup

References

Quaternary geologic formations
Geology of England
Geology of Scotland
Geology of Wales
Geological groups of the United Kingdom